Somerset is a rural community in the Canadian province of Nova Scotia, located in the Municipality of the District of Lunenburg.

References
  Somerset on Destination Nova Scotia

Communities in Lunenburg County, Nova Scotia
General Service Areas in Nova Scotia